Nebria nigerrima testadilatata is a species of ground beetle in the Nebriinae subfamily that can be found in Asian countries such as  Azerbaijan and Iran.

References

nigerrima testadilatata
Beetles described in 1974
Beetles of Asia